François Sérvanin (born 20 September 1941) is a French former racing driver.

References

1941 births
Living people
French racing drivers
24 Hours of Le Mans drivers
Place of birth missing (living people)
20th-century French people

BMW M drivers